James T. McFarland (March 13, 1930 – January 15, 2015) was an American lawyer and politician from New York.

Life
He was born on March 13, 1930, in Buffalo, New York. He graduated B.S. from Canisius College in 1951, and J.D. from University of Buffalo Law School in 1954. He served in the U.S. Army from 1954 to 1956. Then he practiced law in Buffalo. He married Geraldine T. Walsh, and they have four children.

McFarland entered politics as a Republican, and became an aide to Assemblyman William E. Adams in 1964. In November 1964, Adams was defeated for re-election, but in November 1965 Adams was elected to the State Senate, and McFarland was elected to Adams's old Assembly seat. McFarland was a member of the New York State Assembly from 1966 to 1972, sitting in the 176th, 177th, 178th and 179th New York State Legislatures.

He was a member of the New York State Senate from 1973 to 1978, sitting in the 180th, 181st and 182nd New York State Legislatures.

He was a member of the New York State Civil Service Commission from 1978 to 1987; and of the New York Public Service Commission from 1987 to 1992.

He died of Alzheimer’s disease on January 15, 2015, in Getzville, New York at age 84.

References

1930 births
2015 deaths
Politicians from Buffalo, New York
Republican Party New York (state) state senators
Republican Party members of the New York State Assembly
Canisius College alumni
University at Buffalo Law School alumni
Lawyers from Buffalo, New York
20th-century American lawyers